Rollin' Home to Texas is a 1940 American Western film directed by Albert Herman and written by Robert Emmett Tansey. The film stars Tex Ritter, Cal Shrum, Slim Andrews, Virginia Carpenter, Eddie Dean and Jack Rutherford. The film was released on December 30, 1940, by Monogram Pictures.

Plot

Cast          
Tex Ritter as Tex Reed
Cal Shrum as Cal Shrum
Slim Andrews as Slim Hunkapillar
Virginia Carpenter as Mary Gray
Eddie Dean as Eddie Dean
Jack Rutherford as Carter
Minta Durfee (uncredited)
Walt Shrum as Smokey
I. Stanford Jolley as Red
Charles R. Phipps as Uncle Jim
Harry Harvey Sr. as Lockwood
Olin Francis as Marshal
White Flash as Tex's horse

References

External links
 

1940 films
American Western (genre) films
1940 Western (genre) films
Monogram Pictures films
Films directed by Albert Herman
American black-and-white films
1940s English-language films
1940s American films